Dickinson High School may refer to:

 Dickinson High School (Dickinson, North Dakota), a public high school located in Dickinson, North Dakota
 Dickinson High School (Texas), Dickinson, Texas
 John Dickinson High School, Wilmington, Delaware
 William L. Dickinson High School, Jersey City, New Jersey